Turkmenistan made its Paralympic Games debut at the 2000 Summer Paralympics in Sydney, with Atajan Begniyazov as its sole representative (in the men's up to 48 kg in powerlifting). It has competed in every edition of the Summer Paralympics since then, but never in the Winter Paralympics. Turkmens have only ever competed in powerlifting, and have never won a medal at the Paralympic Games.

See also
 Turkmenistan at the Olympics

References